Penn Masala is an American a cappella group. It is the world's first and premier South Asian a cappella group. Formed in 1996 by students at the University of Pennsylvania, Penn Masala's music has been influenced by the Eastern and Western cultures that represent the group's membership. The group was featured on the soundtrack of American Desi, and has released twelve full-length albums: Awaaz, 11 PM, Soundcheck, The Brown Album, Pehchaan, On Detours, Panoramic, Kaavish, Resonance,Yuva, Musafir, Midnight Oil,  an EP titled Vol. 1 and the compilation album Out of Stock. The group has performed at the White House, the Indian Filmfare Awards, and for prominent leaders including Ban Ki-moon and Mukesh Ambani. The group also had a cameo role in Pitch Perfect 2, released in May 2015.

History
Penn Masala, often stylized as pennmasala, was formed in 1996 by students at the University of Pennsylvania who wanted to represent their subcontinental heritage and music through a cappella singing. Among other, more long-standing a cappella groups, Penn Masala stood out as the only one in the world that sang Hindi music. This defining characteristic of the group brought it immediate attention as members fused Hindi and English music in original song formats. Soon, the group began to bill itself as "The world's first and premier Hindi a cappella group". Within just four years of its inception, Penn Masala had gained close to 15 members. By 2002, the group released its first two CDs: Awaaz (Hindi for sound) was released in 1999, and 11 PM was released in 2001. Over the next 3 years, Penn Masala released two more full-length albums, Soundcheck and The Brown Album, and a compilation CD entitled Out of Stock, which included favorites from the first 3 albums. In 2007, the group released its fifth studio album, Pehchaan (Hindi for identity). The group followed up the success of Pehchaan with their sixth album, On Detours, which was released in March 2009 and Panoramic, released in 2011. In 2013, they released their eighth studio album titled Kaavish, which features the hit single "Fix You / Ishq Bina". In March 2014, Penn Masala released The Evolution of Bollywood Music video, which has since received over 1 million views on YouTube. They were invited to perform at the 2014 IIFA Awards as a result of the media attention they subsequently received. In the fall of 2014, Penn Masala released a music video for their cover of Manwa Laage from the movie Happy New Year, featuring prominent artist Jonita Gandhi. The track was selected to be on the Best of College A Cappella (BOCA) album in 2015. In March 2015, Penn Masala released The Bollywood Breakdown, a compilation of contemporary songs that combine elements of hip-hop with Bollywood music. In May 2015, Penn Masala released the music video for Tonight (I’m Lovin’ You) / Dilliwaali Girlfriend, a mix featured on their ninth album, Resonance. The group had a cameo role in Pitch Perfect 2, released in May 2015, as competitors to the Barden Bellas. The soundtrack for the movie included Penn Masala's Hindi version of "Any Way You Want It", and won the award for the Best Soundtrack at the American Music Awards in 2015. Their tenth studio album, Yuva, was released in 2017. An EP, Vol. 1, was released in 2018, their eleventh album, Musafir, was released in 2020, and their twelfth and most recent album, Midnight Oil, was released in 2022.

Performances

Penn Masala performs around the world, with much of their traveling done in the United States; the group performs at numerous universities and events across the world, spanning cities from Kolkata to London to Montreal and San Francisco.

In 1998, soon after the release of Awaaz, Penn Masala went on its first international tour to the United Kingdom, hitting the airwaves and performing all across the United Kingdom. The group gave two particularly noteworthy concerts in New York City: once in 2000 at the Zee Gold Bollywood Awards in the Nassau Coliseum, and again in 2002 at the Bollywood Music Awards in the Hammerstein Ballroom.

India tours

The group has traveled to India multiple times. In 2002, the group traveled to Mumbai, India to perform at the Star Screen Awards, during which time the members appeared on MTV Asia. In 2006, the group celebrated its 10th anniversary with a tour of India. The men performed at such venues as the National Centre for the Performing Arts at Nariman Point in Mumbai and Swabhumi in Kolkata. In January 2010, the group did another tour across India, selling out the Hard Rock Cafes in New Delhi and Mumbai. Penn Masala also performed at the Oberoi Trident at a ceremony honoring the achievements of Reliance Industries Chairman Mukesh Ambani. Present were many notable personalities, including Nita Ambani, director Rajkumar Hirani, director/producer Vidhu Vinod Chopra, former Chief Minister of Jammu and Kashmir Farooq Abdullah, actors Imran Khan, Rahul Bose and Vinod Khanna, and cricketer Sachin Tendulkar among others. The group also performed at the well-known Lumbini Park Amphitheatre in Hyderabad, and were featured in numerous media outlets, including NDTV, CNBC TV 18, BBC Asia, The Hindustan Times, Zee TV, and CNN-IBN among others. Penn Masala's fourth India tour took place in January 2013, where they shot a music video of "Fix You / Ishq Bina" and performed in five cities across all of the Hard Rock Cafes in the entire country. The January 2013 tour was covered by many major India new outlets, including The Times of India and DNA India, who met with members Ram Narayan and Sam Levenson to write about the tour. Their most recent tour to India was in May 2017.

United Kingdom and Canada tours

After its initial United Kingdom tour, Penn Masala continued reaching out to audiences abroad with a tour of the nation in March 2010. Among others, two notable performances were at St. James Piccadilly in central London, and in Hammersmith, where the group headlined a nationwide music competition. In November 2010 Penn Masala performed in Montreal, their first Canadian performance in ten years. Then again in 2012, Penn Masala toured the United Kingdom and did a show for The Rajasthani Foundation's Diwali Charity Gala Ball. Audience members included the Hinduja Brothers of the Hinduja Group, Lakshmi Narayan Mittal, Europe's richest man and CEO of ArcelorMittal, as well as the company's CFO Aditya Mittal. The group performed in the United Kingdom in October 2018 as well.

Domestic tours
 
Every semester, Penn Masala tours at a few university campuses. For example, in 2011, Penn Masala performed full-length shows at University of Michigan, Vanderbilt University, Ohio University, University of Houston, Rutgers University, Philadelphia Museum of Art, University of North Carolina, University of Maryland and a second performance at Rutgers University, as well as an international gig in the United Kingdom. The group performed at Southern Methodist University for Bhangra Blitz in April 2013. However, on top of these routine performances, Penn Masala has also performed for a number of famous individuals ranging from Anderson Cooper to Henry Kissinger to Ban Ki-Moon.

On October 14, 2009, Penn Masala performed at the White House in Washington, D.C. for the White House's celebration of Diwali and the signing ceremony of the Initiative on Asian Americans and Pacific Islanders. The event took place in the East Room, with attendees including President Barack Obama, the Secretary of Commerce and Secretary of Education, Associate Director of Public Engagement Kalpen Modi (also known as Kal Penn), members of Congress, and distinguished community members. Penn Masala opened the ceremony with a performance which was followed by a speech by President Obama, who commended their creative energy and contributions to the Asian American community. In fact in 2012, it was leaked that along with artists such as Jay-Z, Adam Levine, Fergie, Arcade Fire and others, Penn Masala was to be courted by President Barack Obama's team in order to obtain their celebrity endorsement. In 2011, Penn Masala was invited to perform for the presidents of universities all over the world as well as UN Secretary General Ban Ki Moon.

Penn Masala also holds a large annual spring concert at the University of Pennsylvania in the university's largest performance venue, Irvine Auditorium. The concert features a wide selection of their songs, and incorporates humor throughout the show using skits and videos that often parody or spoof popular culture. The end of the show is usually marked by a traditional gathering of Masala alumni and current members of the group on stage to commemorate the group and its extensive alumni network.

Music
Penn Masala combines various musical traditions, including Hindi film music, pop, hip-hop, R&B, rock, and Indian classical styles. The group also uses a wide array of languages in their songs. Their compositions are primarily sung in English or Hindi, but certain songs include Arabic, Punjabi, Kannada, and Tamil as well.

Penn Masala blends popular songs to create its own independent version, which is melodically and thematically unified. Most songs fuse popular Hindi and English songs (in the past the group has covered songs by artists such as U2 and Justin Timberlake),  into an a cappella rendition. Some songs are purely Hindi; for example, "Bahara" on Panoramic, and "Yeh Honsla" on On Detours and others purely English, such as "What Goes Around Comes Around" on On Detours. Other songs, such as "Aicha" and "Is Pal Mein", incorporate Hindi and English lyrics into a single song. "Aankhon Mein Tu Hai" also includes Tamil verses, "Saade Dil Te", "Kangna" and "Tere Werga" incorporate Punjabi songs, while  "Masala Dosa" begins with the Kannada hymn "Krishna Ni Begane", "Aicha" includes Arabic verses and "Fix You - Ishq Bina" includes Bengali. While most of the group's songs are interpretations of already-existing songs, the group also composes originals (one or two per album), such as "Main Tanha" and "Pehchaan" on the album Pehchaan, "Kal Ka Sapna" and "Distant Places" on On Detours, "Is Pal Mein" and "Kaash" on Panoramic, "Mann Mein Ujaala" on Kaavish, "Reflection (In Your Eyes)" on Resonance, "Ishaara" on Yuva and "Meant To Be/Chalta Raha" on Musafir.

Penn Masala's music has been popularly and critically acclaimed. "Meri Sapno Ki Rani" and "Aap Jaise Koi" were both featured in American Desi, while a music video for "Chamak Challo" debuted in the Top 10 on Channel [V] India. Both "Chamak Challo" and "Bharat Humko Jaan Se Pyara Hai", a celebration of India's 50th anniversary of independence, brought immediate attention to the group in the fall of 1997, and have been fan favorites ever since. Penn Masala songs have been routinely selected for Varsity Vocals' Best of Collegiate A Cappella CD. "Bharat Humko Jaan Se Pyara Hai" was the first Penn Masala song to be honored. After that, " "Pehchaan" from Pehchaan, "Lovestoned/Ya Ali" from On Detours, "Is Pal Mein" from Panoramic, and "Manwa Laage" from Resonance have all been selected to be on the Best of Collegiate A Cappella CD for their respective years.

In 2012, the group was named one of the five best college a cappella groups in the United States by USA Today and twelve best college a cappella groups by online magazine Her Campus.

Members
Penn Masala is a living, evolving group. Made up of University of Pennsylvania students, the group's membership constantly changes as veteran members graduate and new members enter the group through an audition process. Although the majority of Penn Masala's members are of Indian descent, non-Indian members such as Brian Hong, Sam Levenson, Brendan McManus, and Albert Gu have been a part of the group. Former members also occasionally perform with the group when they tour different cities.

Penn Masala currently consists of: Saaketh Narayan, Albert Gu, Vishvesh Dhar, Sachit Gali, Riju Datta, Venugopal Chillal, and Samarth Nayak.

Alumni

The group also gives special thanks to the following: Santosh Govindaraju, Siddhartha Khosla, Swapnil Shah, Sameer Mungur, Ananda Sen, Vishal Oberoi

Discography

Albums
Midnight Oil (2022)
Musafir (2020)
Penn Masala, Vol.1 (2018)
Yuva (2017)
Resonance (2015)
Kaavish (2013)
Panoramic (2011)
On Detours (2009)
Pehchaan (2007)
Out of Stock (2005)
The Brown Album (2005)
Soundcheck (2003)
Aap Jaisa Koi (2001) (from American Desi)
11 PM (2001)
Awaaz (1999)

Midnight Oil (2022)

Musafir (2020)

Penn Masala, Vol.1 (2018)

Yuva - (2017)

Resonance - (2015)

Kaavish - (2013)

Panoramic - (2011)

On Detours - (2009)

Pehchaan - (2007)

The Brown Album - (2005)

References

External links
 
 Penn Masala performs at the White House
 Penn Masala on NDTV's Friday Night Lights

University of Pennsylvania
Collegiate a cappella groups
American people of Bengali descent
Musical groups established in 1996
American vocal groups